Lionel Beauxis (born 24 October 1985) is a former French rugby union player.

Lionel Beauxis made his international debut for France against Italy during the 2007 Six Nations Championship. He had earlier made the step up to professional rugby with Stade Francais, vying with Juan Martin Hernandez for the outside half berth.

Following his debut Beauxis was selected for France's squad for the 2007 Rugby World Cup. During the tournament he made six appearances, first as a replacement against Namibia and Ireland before securing a starting slot against Georgia, a game in which scored his first international try.

Beauxis retained the jersey for France's famous win over New Zealand at the Millennium Stadium in the quarter-final and also started as Les Bleus were knocked out of the tournament in the semi-final by England. He made a further replacement appearance as France were humbled 34-10 by Argentina in the third-place playoff.

Beauxis missed the entire international season in 2008 due to a nagging back injury, ruling him out of both the Six Nations and autumn internationals. In January 2009 he was named as the sole recognised fly-half in Marc Lièvremont's French squad for the 2009 Six Nations.

The fly-half was turning out for Stade Francais at this stage but endured a three-year absence from the national side while Marc Lièvremont was at the helm. But come the 2012 Six Nations - with Beauxis switching from Stade Francais to Toulouse and Philippe Saint-André in charge of Les Bleus - Beauxis was back in the international reckoning. He played a role in all five of their matches and started both of their last two games.

He confirmed his transfer for his current club Bordeaux Begles, from Stade Francais in January 2014. Leading the club to an emphatic start to the 2014–15 season with wins over established clubs Racing Metro (30-21), Clermont (51-21) and previous year's Top 14 finalists Castres (59-7).

Notes

1985 births
Living people
Sportspeople from Tarbes
French rugby union players
World Rugby Awards winners
Stade Français players
Stade Toulousain players
France international rugby union players
Rugby union fly-halves